Freestyle to Music, sometimes known as Musical Kur or simply kur (from German kür, "freestyle") is a form of dressage competition where the horses paces are set to music to create a competitive "dance". Movements and figures are choreographed to meet the technical requirements of the particular level with carefully chosen music that highlights the horse/rider combination. Musical Freestyles are entertaining and offer great audience appeal. International level competition comprises Prix St. Georges for Young Riders, Intermediate I and Grand Prix through the Fédération Équestre Internationale (FEI).

In October 1980, GB Olympic Rider Jennie Loriston-Clarke and Musician Gaynor Colbourn did the very first Demonstration of Dressage to Music. Olympic horses Dutch Courage and Dutch Gold starred in the demo which showed horse, rider and musician working in total harmony. This event marked the beginnings of Dressage to Music Competitions, and Jennie Loriston-Clarke and Gaynor Colbourn still work together to promote the sport they kicked off in 1980.

Levels 
As well as the international levels, Young Rider (Prix St. George), Intermediate I and Grand Prix, most National Federations (i.e. USDF, British Dressage have their own freestyle levels which usually correspond to their various levels of training. 
Each level has its own list of mandatory movements and paces that must appear in all programs, however their order and timing is free to the rider's discretion, albeit within certain margins. Additionally, movements of the same or lower level which are not listed as compulsory may be included to demonstrate the skills and harmony of horse and rider. Incorporating movements of a higher level than the intended level is forbidden, with penalties varying from elimination in lower levels to specific deductions and limits in FEI events. For example, an Intermediare I rider is not permitted to include passage, piaffe, or a pirouette greater than 360 degrees, and a Grand Prix rider may not do a pirouette that exceeds 720 degrees or advanced airs above the ground. If a rider does so, he or she receives a zero for the element, and in addition the score for Choreography and Degree of Difficulty will not receive a score higher than a 5.

Musical Freestyles are a component of the dressage competition at the Olympics, and the World Equestrian Games, where the Grand Prix Freestyle is used.

Scoring components
The scoring of the freestyle is divided up into two major sections, known as Technical Execution, and Artistic Presentation.

Technical requirements
The technical section is made up of scores for each of the compulsory movements. The technical requirements of each level mirror the level of training and balance expected in the compulsory tests at that level. Competence and ease in the execution of the movements is crucial to a successful program.

While the Technical Execution is divided so as to make up half the final score (50%), the technical components of rhythm, energy and elasticity and harmony between horse and rider are scored on the artistic portion score sheet as replacement for the collective marks on a set test, additionally, poor technical execution can negatively affect the degree of difficulty, Choreography and Music scores, thus the technical execution make up nominally 70% of the final score, and can affect all of the marks.

The format of technical marks in the Grand Prix

Artistic
The Artistic score is usually divided into 5 sections each with a coefficient of four at International competitions, They are:
Rhythm, Energy and Elasticity
Harmony between horse & rider
Choreography
Degree of Difficulty
Choice and Interpretation of the music
The Rhythm, Energy and Elasticity mark comprises the first two collective marks from a set test, that being Paces and Impulsion, while the Harmony between Horse & Rider mark is made up of the second two: Submission and Rider. The remaining scores are somewhat connected to the technical execution, but are for the most part dependent on the artistic qualities of the test.

Choreography
The choreography must incorporate all the technical requirements for the level but is otherwise open to creative choices and highlighting the horse's strong points. Good marks are awarded to inventive choreography which contains movements not taken directly out of the set tests, but has an element of surprise and adventure to their placement. However, there should still be a logical order and flow to the movements, such as symmetry and without too many changes between the paces. A chaotic freestyle would score worse than a basic one.

Music 
When Gaynor Colbourn and Jennie Loriston Clarke originated the sport as we know it in 1980, the whole ethos was for Dressage to Music to be beautiful, as with Ballet and Ice Dancing, and in the earlt 1980's the Grand Prix Freestyle was judged by Prima Ballerina Merle Park, and Ice Skater, Robin Cousins.This ensured that the judging of the Artistic Element was a highly experienced performer.

The music chosen will depend on the horse's movement, type, personality, and the rider's own musical tastes but should serve to accentuate all of them. Music for freestyles can be found in a variety of styles; Classical music, show tunes, movie scores, orchestral versions of pop and contemporary music are common choices.The PPL Licence is required for all music being ridden to at any venue, and is to ensure that Original Music, which is the Intellectual Property of the Composer/Artist is not reproduced by a third party for financial gain, through breach of copyright.

Generally, it is preferred that the music for all three gaits should be of the same genre, but this is by no means set in stone. It is more important that the music flows seamlessly through the transitions.

The interpretation of the music means that it should enhance the horse's way of going and match the tempos of his gaits. The music should suggest the movements; transitions should correspond to the transitions in the music. It is imperative that the choreography interpret the music. Movements and figures should be started and finished at obvious musical phrases.

Degree of difficulty
The level of difficulty should correspond to the horse's abilities so that the ride looks easy. A horse which is more advanced horse for any given level will be able to perform more complex movement combinations, or more extreme movements (e.g. 720° pirouette, 2:3 Half-Pass etc.) which are rewarded as being more difficult. However, this comes at the increased risk of loss of rhythm or a mistake in sequence, which would result in more marks lost that would have been gained. A good freestyle program is entertaining to the audience and pleasing to perform.

References

External links 
Fédération Équestre Internationale
United States Dressage Federation

Dressage terminology